The 1921 election for Mayor of Los Angeles took place on June 7, 1921. Incumbent Meredith P. Snyder was defeated by George E. Cryer. It was the last time Snyder ran for Mayor.

Municipal elections in California, including Mayor of Los Angeles, are officially nonpartisan; candidates' party affiliations do not appear on the ballot.

Election 
Incumbent Democratic mayor Meredith P. Snyder had previously been elected in 1919 and was running for a fourth term. He was challenged by Republican George E. Cryer, who attacked Snyder for being corrupt and was supported by the Los Angeles Police Commissioner and the Los Angeles Times. Cryer stated that he was a non-politician and would conduct the business of Los Angeles "like any other business... quietly, effectively, efficiently." Former city councilmember Boyle Workman also challenged Snyder for the seat.

Results

References

External links
 Office of the City Clerk, City of Los Angeles

1921
1921 California elections
Los Angeles
1920s in Los Angeles